is a Japanese pink film actress and striptease performer. She entered the pink film profession at the advanced age of 29, became a star in the field at 31, and won a Best Actress award for her work in this genre in 2003 at the age of 36.

Life and career

Early life
Motoko Sasaki was born on February 15, 1967. She became interested in the stage in middle school, and first began acting in her high school drama club. She had an invitation to pursue the study of acting after graduation from high school, but her father believed that a girl should not attend college. Sasaki wound up working as a civil servant in the same government district as her father. She continued acting in community theater at this time, gaining  acting experience in the Shingeki style. She reports that the turning point in her life came when a traveling drama troupe visited her community. The director told her that if she were serious about acting, she would have to learn the basics at training school. She was 22 years of age at the time, and she decided to reject the typical life of marriage and raising children; with 1.5 million yen saved from her salary, she moved to Tokyo to pursue an acting career.

Stripping career
In Tokyo Sasaki was recruited to perform as a stripper. To cover the cost of living, Sasaki accepted the job. Since she had never seen a strip show, she attended a performance in Ueno. By the end of the performance she had determined to look at the experience as a form of "training school" in dialogue-free body acting. Performing four times a day for a relatively modest 20 million yen a month, Sasaki feels she could have made more money at a hostess bar. But Sasaki stuck with this profession, as it did not require she have physical contact with the audience, and it allowed her to experiment and expand on her craft with each performance. She invested her earnings into her wardrobe and put effort into her interpretations of the songs to which she danced. For three years she studied acting during the day and stripped in the evenings. Recalling the devotion of her fans, including grandfathers who would give her gifts after the show, she remembers this career with fondness.

Film career
Sasaki made her pink film debut in 1996 at the unusually advanced age of 29. She later joked that since young actresses are not abundant in pink films, she felt confident in her new line of work. Her second film for Ikejima, Beautiful Secretary: Rip Off the Panty Hose (1997), won Sasaki the Best New Actress, Third Place award at the Pink Grand Prix. The film was named fourth best pink release of the year.

Sasaki's acting training and experience has given her versatility in her pink film career, in which she is competent in both serious and comic roles. Her sensual and charming performance style recalls that of the classic Nikkatsu Roman Porno Queens.

Director Sachio Kitazawa's The Horny Widow (1998) was a light erotic film starring Sasaki as the widow of a jeweler, having an affair and suffering at the hands of a rapist and blackmailer. The film became a hit in its video release, bringing Sasaki, then 31, late-comer stardom in the pink profession.

In Nōpan Amadera: Ureta Shigemi (1998) Sasaki actually shaved her head for the role of a teacher who becomes a Buddhist nun.

The main feature of the December 2000 issue of P*G magazine was an interview with Sasaki on the fourth anniversary of her pink film debut. Since 1994 P*G has been the leading journal on the pink film, and is the host of the Pink Grand Prix, the major awards ceremony for the genre. Sasaki won the Best Actress award at the Pink Grand Prix for her performance in Yutaka Ikejima's Adulterous Wife's Dirty Afternoon (2003), which was given the Silver Prize for Best Film at the ceremony.

Bibliography

English

Japanese

References

 
|-
! colspan="3" style="background: #DAA520;" | Pink Grand Prix
|-

External links 
 

1967 births
Japanese film actresses
Japanese female erotic dancers
Pink film actors
Living people